Trekanten is a neighbourhood in the city of Kristiansand in Agder county, Norway. It is located in the borough of Vågsbygd and in the district of Slettheia. The neighborhood includes a large commercial area.

It is located around a triangle formed by the junction of three arterial roads within Vågsbygd borough in Slettheia (its name means The Triangle in English). Trekanten is next to Norwegian County Road 456, which in June 2014 was transferred into a new  dual carriageway tunnel emerging at Trekanten.

The centre contains various shops, offices, child welfare, and healthcare facilities.

Transportation

References

Geography of Kristiansand
Neighbourhoods of Kristiansand